Assing is a German surname. Notable people with the surname include:

 David Assing (1787–1842), German physician and poet
 Rosa Maria Assing, née Varnhagen (1783–1840), German writer
 Ottilie Assing (1819–1884), German writer
 Ludmilla Assing (1821–1880), German writer
  (born 1932), German historian and logician

Given name:
 Assing "Aki" Aleong

References 

German-language surnames
Jewish surnames